West End is a village and civil parish in Surrey Heath, Surrey, England, approximately  southwest of central London. It is midway between the towns of Camberley and Woking,  to the west and east respectively.  The River Bourne rises from its sources to the immediate west to run through the village. Until the mid 20th century, the West End consisted of a collection of smallholdings surrounded by a substantial area of common land

West End Common is comparable in size to Chobham Common to the north and includes training ranges of the British Army. Brentmoor Heath is to the north west of the village.

The village is close to junction 3 of the M3 motorway.

History

Nearby lands were settled in prehistoric times, evidenced within this civil parish, with a megalithic barrow on Westend Common.

West End may have obtained its name because it was the west of Chobham,  ENE. The 1845 map reproduced by EJ Willson provides boundaries at that date.   Its direct predecessor named Westend was in 1870–72 described by John Marius Wilson as "a tything in Worplesdon parish, Surrey; 3¼ miles NW of Guildford. Pop., 341." A dependency on Worplesdon church, as its tything, is attested in the medieval period until the late 19th century, after which the area formed part of the parish of Chobham.

The "parish church", i.e. Church of England church of Holy Trinity, West End serves a similar area ecclesiastical parish and is a small building consisting of a chancel consecrated in 1890, nave consecrated in 1842, and a vestry built in 1906. The material is stone and the style is 13th century. Over the west end is a small bell-turret with a square spire above the entrance. Recognising rising population and housebuilding, the village gained its parish in 1895.

In the 20th century many houses were added to the village, during which period books on the county and subject of nurseries show it to be a significant economic centre of nursery gardening. The civil parish was created in 1968.

Facilities

Amenities
The village provides some small shops and hairdressers and a BP garage.  Some works operate, particularly in warehousing and distribution however most employment of an industrial, commercial, or retail kind is in neighbouring areas.

Events
Every year on the village recreation ground is its Summer Fete and in the autumn, The Horticultural and Agricultural Show.

Sports
The two grounds in the village host a seniors football team and cricket team, competing within the county.

Transport
The bus routes 34 and 35 travel through the village at intervals of 30 minutes.

Localities

Donkey Town
The western neighbourhood of the village has this locality name.  However it has never formed a historically recorded hamlet under the vestry-administered system.  The area is not mentioned in county records under the name of a manor.

West End Common
West End Common is a restricted access area, not inhabited and is home to many rare heathland plants and has been designated a Site of Special Scientific Interest (SSSI) by English Nature. It is also a Thames Basin Heaths Special Protection Area within the remit of Surrey Heath.

Lucas Green
A linear settlement on a cul-de-sac road, Lucas Green Road, leading to the periphery of West End Common, Lucas Green has a close cluster of four buildings, surrounding Lucas Green Manor, which are listed.  One, Lucas Green Manor house, at Grade II dates to the 16th century, and Lucas Green further extends down Lucas Green Road leading on to a small hamlet on the left consisting of eleven more properties, some of which date back to the 17th Century.

Bordering settlements

Education
The village has two schools: the Holy Trinity Church of England Primary school and Gordon's School which was built in commemoration of Gordon of Khartoum.

Geography

Soil and Elevation
Soil
Heath which is naturally wet, very acid sandy and loamy soil dominates except in patches of highest land where the Bagshot Formation of sand and sandstone contributes a greater proportion than organic matter.  This heath soil is just 1.9% of English soil and 0.2% of Welsh soil, which gives rise to pines and coniferous landscapes, as well as more commonly gorse, ericaceae (all types of heather) and patches of bog.

Elevation
All the highest areas are on the western border.  White Hill here provides the highest point and is publicly accessible, immediately north of Red Road which leads to Camberley 120m Above Ordnance Datum (the UK conventional measure of mean sea level).   This is towards the north of a long, wide north-south ridge, known as it descends rapidly east through into the rolling restricted common as Chobham Ridges.  The ridge is topped by a road, The Maultway, bounding an estate of Camberley, known as Heatherside.

Drainage and watercourses
The River Bourne (Addlestone branch) runs through the village from its sources directly to the rapidly rising landscape to the rest, largely in the civil parish.

Demography and housing
The population rose between the 2001 and 2011 censuses from 4,272 to 4,693 (on an increase of 48 households).

The average level of accommodation in the region composed of detached houses was 28%, the average that was apartments was 22.6%.

The proportion of households in the civil parish who owned their home outright compares to the regional average of 35.1%.  The proportion who owned their home with a loan compares to the regional average of 32.5%.  The remaining % is made up of rented dwellings (plus a negligible % of households living rent-free).

Residents
Brian May, lead guitarist of Queen (band) is a local resident.

References

External links

 Old photos
 Multimap
 National Archives, Surrey History Centre
 1829 Map (West End not named but can be seen just above Bisley)
 1845 Map (West End not named but can be seen just above Bisley)

Villages in Surrey
Surrey Heath
Civil parishes in Surrey